"More Than Words" is a 1991 ballad written and originally performed by the rock band Extreme.

More Than Words may also refer to:

 More Than Words (Mark 'Oh album) released 2004
 More Than Words: The Best of Kevin Kern an album by Kevin Kern
 More Than Words (Brian McKnight album) released 2013
 "More Than Words" a Maaya Sakamoto song
 More Than Words a 2014 Philippine TV series
 More Than Words (Moazanwazu) a 2022 Japanese TV series

See also
"More Than Words Can Say", a 1990 song by Alias
More Than Words Can Say (album), a 2006 album by Stevie Holland